Your Squaw Is on the Warpath is thirteenth solo studio album by American country music singer-songwriter Loretta Lynn. It was released on February 17, 1969, by Decca Records.

The album includes cover versions of hit country songs, including "Harper Valley P.T.A." by Jeannie C. Riley and "Kaw-Liga" by Hank Williams, and the 1968 hit "I Walk Alone" by Marty Robbins.

The song "Barney" was on the original 1969 pressings of the album. The Salem cigarette company filed a claim that the music was a violation of their copyrighted theme for their commercials. As a result, the original LP was recalled and then re-released without this song on it.

Critical reception 

The review published in the March 8, 1969 issue of Billboard said, "It appears Miss Lynn can do no wrong when it comes to unique and fine performances and top sales. The title tune of this hot LP  went right to the top of the country charts and this package of clever material will fast follow suit. Among the highlights are "You've Just Stepped In", "Kaw-Liga", and the compelling Teddy Wilburn ballad, "Taking the Place of My Man"."

Cashbox published a review in the March 1, 1969 issue that said, "Your Squaw Is on the Warpath is destined to beat a path straight to the charts for Loretta Lynn. Titled after her recent country chart topper, this album contains the classic "Kaw-Liga" as well as the contemporary hit "Harper Valley P.T.A." Watch charts for rapid appearance."

The album was given a positive review by AllMusic, which gave the album 4 out of 5 stars, but criticized the album cover, calling it "one of the classic politically incorrect album covers."

Commercial performance 
The album peaked at No. 2 on the US Billboard Hot Country LP's chart and No. 168 on the US Billboard Top LP's chart.

The album's first single, "You've Just Stepped In (From Stepping Out on Me)" was released in May 1968 and peaked at No. 2 on the US Billboard Hot Country Singles chart. The second single, "Your Squaw Is on the Warpath, was released in September 1968 and peaked at No. 3.

Recording 
Recording sessions for the album took place at Bradley's Barn in Mount Juliet, Tennessee, beginning on May 9, 1968. Three additional sessions followed on August 30, November 18 and 19. "Living My Lifetime for You" was recorded during the January 9 session for 1968's Fist City. "(This Bottle's) Taking the Place of My Man" was recorded during the April 20, 1967 session for Lynn's 1967 album, Singin' with Feelin'.

Track listing 

Note: "Barney" was only included on first pressings of the album. It was removed from all subsequent pressings and was also excluded from the album's digital download release.

Personnel
Adapted from the Decca recording session records.
Harold Bradley – electric bass guitar
Owen Bradley – producer
Floyd Cramer – piano
Ray Edenton – acoustic guitar
Larry Estes – drums
Buddy Harman – drums
Junior Huskey – bass
The Jordanaires – background vocals
Loretta Lynn – lead vocals
Grady Martin – guitar, lead electric guitar
Harold Morrison – banjo
Norbert Putnam – bass
Hal Rugg – steel guitar
Pete Wade – guitar
Teddy Wilburn – background vocals
Joe Zinkan – bass

Charts
Album

Singles

References 

1969 albums
Loretta Lynn albums
Albums produced by Owen Bradley
Decca Records albums